Bruce Spencer is an American drummer, drumming instructor and clinician, singer and session musician, songwriter, record producer, best known for his work with the rock and roll trio, The 77s.

Spencer has also played the drums for artists including Wynonna Judd, Charlie Peacock, Brent Bourgeois, Larry Tagg, Roger Smith, JGB, Agnes Stone (qwest), Zoppi (MCA), Chris Webster, Jackie Greene, and many others.

References

External links
 The 77s

Living people
American drummers
American performers of Christian music
American record producers
Musicians from California
The 77s members
Vector (band) members
Year of birth missing (living people)